Wali-e-Mewat Raja Khanzada  Alawal Khan, Bahadur, son of Khanzada Zakaria Khan Mewati,  was the Khanzada Rajput ruler of Mewat from 1485 till 1504. He was succeeded by his son Hasan Khan Mewati as Wali-e-Mewat in 1504. In 1492 he won Bala Quila from Nikumbh Rajputs to stop the practice of human sacrifice.

References

 

Mewat
Indian Muslims
Year of birth unknown